Blood Cult is a 1985 American direct-to-video slasher film directed and co-edited by Christopher Lewis and starring Juli Andelman, Charles Ellis, James Vance, and Bennie Lee McGowan. It is notable for being one of the first shot-on-video horror films to achieve notoriety, being heavily promoted to the video rental market.

The film was shot in Tulsa, Oklahoma over nine days in March 1985 using two Betacam cameras, under the working title The Sorority House Murders.

Plot
A mysterious serial killer is killing female students on and off a college campus in Oklahoma, and the only clues are gold medallions left by the bodies. A grizzled police detective, Ron, sets out to find the killer but the hunter becomes the hunted when he sees that no one around him can be trusted, not even his daughter. The detective is unaware that all the killings lead to a secret society that worships the god "Canis" and offer human sacrifices.

Cast
 Juli Andelman as Tina Wilbois
 Charles Ellis as Ron Wilbois
 James Vance as Joel Hogan
 Bennie Lee McGowan as Mrs. Gracie Moore
 Peter Hart as Doc White
 David Stice as Deputy
 Fred Graves as Dean Charles Bailey
 Bob Duffield as Mr. Moore

Release
Blood Cult was released for the first time on DVD by Vci Video on August 28, 2001. Vci later re-released the film as a part of its three-disk "The Ripper Blood Pack" on October 31, 2006. The film was later released by Mill Creek Entertainment on July 24, 2007 as a part of its twelve-disk "Decrepit Crypt of Nightmares: 50 Movie Pack". It was last released again by Vci on September 11, 2012 as a double feature with Revenge (1986).

Reception

Blood Cult received mostly negative reviews from critics.
Justin Kerswell, from Hysteria Lives!, awarded the film 1/5 stars, due to the film's lack of suspense/thrills, "laughable" dialogue and for having "the most unattractive cast in slasher movie history". Josh G. from Oh, the Horror hated the film, stating that the film started out well, but was ruined by poor acting, gore effects, "ridiculous dialogue", and ending. Josh concluded his review by calling it "the cure for sleeplessness".

Todd Martin from HorrorNews.net gave the film a positive review, while also noting the film's poor acting, and special effects. Martin concluded his review by stating, "Yes, it is cheesy as hell and a little over the top at times but if you’re a fan of corny low budget horror flicks then you will most likely dig it as much as I did."

References

External links 
 
 
 

1985 films
1985 direct-to-video films
Camcorder films
1985 horror films
1980s serial killer films
1980s slasher films
American serial killer films
American slasher films
Films shot in Oklahoma
Supernatural slasher films
American exploitation films
American splatter films
1980s English-language films
1980s American films